The Soul Herder is a 1917 American silent Western film directed by John Ford, and featuring Harry Carey. The film is presumed to be lost. The film was premiered in Dayton, Ohio, on August 3, 1917.

Cast
 Harry Carey
 Molly Malone
 Hoot Gibson
 Jean Hersholt as Priest
 Fritzi Ridgeway
 Duke R. Lee
 William Steele credited as William Gettinger
 Elizabeth James as Daughter
 Vester Pegg

Reception
Like many American films of the time, The Soul Herder was subject to cuts by city and state film censorship boards. The Chicago Board of Censors ordered cut scenes showing the shooting of a clergyman, a man muffling a girl in a bedroom, killing a man outside a house, and the closeup of a dead man.

See also
 Harry Carey filmography
 Hoot Gibson filmography
 List of lost films

References

External links
 

1917 films
1917 lost films
1917 Western (genre) films
1917 short films
American silent short films
American black-and-white films
Films directed by John Ford
Lost Western (genre) films
Lost American films
Silent American Western (genre) films
1910s American films
1910s English-language films